Tony Costner (born June 30, 1962) is an American former professional basketball player, who was selected by the Washington Bullets, in the 2nd round (34th overall) of the 1984 NBA Draft. He played professionally in Europe and in the Continental Basketball Association. Costner was a 6'10" (2.08 m) tall center, that played in college at St. Joseph's University. He is the father of former professional basketball player Brandon Costner.

Early life
Costner graduated from Overbrook High School, in Philadelphia, in 1980. In 2012, Costner was recognized by the Philadelphia Daily News, as a Third-Team All City member, on its list of the "Best high school hoops players of the past 35 years".

College career
Costner decided to stay in Philadelphia for his collegiate career. He played at the center position for the St. Joseph Hawks, from 1980 to 1984. He averaged 14.4 points, 7.9 rebounds and 1.1 assists per game in his college career. As a Senior, Costner averaged 18.6 points, 8.3 rebounds and 1.2 assists per game, as St. Joseph's finished the season with a 20–9 record, under head coach Jim Boyle.

On December 30, 1983, Costner scored 47 points in a game versus Alaska-Anchorage, which still stands as the St. Joseph's single-game scoring record. During his college career, Costner was an Atlantic 10 All-Conference selection in his junior and senior seasons, a three-time All-Big 5 selection, and an Associated Press Honorable Mention All-America selection in 1983. In his college career, Costner scored a total of 1,730 career points, to go along with a total of 951 career rebounds.

Professional career
On June 19, 1984, the NBA's Washington Bullets, selected Costner in the second round, with the 34th overall pick of the 1984 NBA Draft. Costner went on to play pro club basketball in Europe, starting his career with Basket Napoli. He spent the 1987–88 season with A.P.U. Udine.

Costner also played in the Continental Basketball Association (CBA), with the Tulsa Fast Breakers, Rockford Lightning, Rochester Flyers, and Philadelphia Spirit. He averaged 11.5 points, 8.0 rebounds and 1.5 assists per game, in his 54-games career with the Rockford Lightning.  In Europe, he also played with Montpellier (1989–90), Limoges (1991–92), Sporting Athens (1992–93), AEK Athens (1993–94), Estudiantes Bahía Blanca (1994), Sporting Athens (1994–96), and Papagou Athens (1996–97).

Personal life
Costner is the father of former North Carolina State and professional player Brandon Costner.

Awards and accomplishments
 Saint Joseph's Men's Basketball Hall of Fame Inductee (1989).
 Philadelphia Big 5 Hall of Fame Inductee (1990).

References

External links
Eurobasket.com Profile
ProBallers.com Profile
StatsCrew.com Profile
Basketball_Reference.com Profile
Sports-Reference.com Profile
St. Joe's Hawks Bio

1962 births
Living people
AEK B.C. players
American expatriate basketball people in Argentina
American expatriate basketball people in France
American expatriate basketball people in Greece
American expatriate basketball people in Italy
American expatriate basketball people in Spain
American men's basketball players
Basketball players from New Jersey
Basket Napoli players
CB Gran Canaria players
Centers (basketball)
Estudiantes de Bahía Blanca basketball players
Greek Basket League players
Lega Basket Serie A players
Liga ACB players
Limoges CSP players
Montpellier Paillade Basket players
Pallalcesto Amatori Udine players
Papagou B.C. players
People from Montclair, New Jersey
Rochester Flyers players
Rockford Lightning players
Saint Joseph's Hawks men's basketball players
Sporting basketball players
Sportspeople from Essex County, New Jersey
Tulsa Fast Breakers players
Washington Bullets draft picks